Christian Ernest Heismann (April 16, 1880 to November 19, 1951) was a Major League Baseball pitcher who played in  and  with the Cincinnati Reds and the Baltimore Orioles. He batted right and threw left-handed.

He was born and died in Cincinnati.

References

External links

1880 births
1951 deaths
Major League Baseball pitchers
Baseball players from Ohio
Baltimore Orioles (1901–02) players
Cincinnati Reds players
Toledo Mud Hens players
Columbia Skyscrapers players
Savannah Pathfinders players
Columbia Gamecocks players
Savannah Indians players
Florence Fiddlers players
Roanoke Tigers players